Sheikh Hamad bin Khalifa bin Hamad bin Abdullah bin Jassim bin Mohammed Al Thani (born 1 January 1952) is a member of the ruling Al Thani Qatari royal family. He was the ruling Emir of Qatar from 1995 until 2013 when he abdicated the throne, handing power to his son Tamim bin Hamad Al Thani. The Qatari government refers to him as the Father Emir.

Hamad seized power from his father, Khalifa bin Hamad Al Thani, in a bloodless palace coup d'état in 1995. During his 18-year rule, Qatar's natural gas production reached 77 million tonnes, making Qatar the richest country in the world per capita with the average income in the country US$86,440 a year per person. During his reign, several sports and diplomatic events took place in Qatar, including the 2006 Asian Games, 2012 UN Climate Change Conference, Doha Agreement, Fatah–Hamas Doha Agreement, and it was decided that the 2022 FIFA World Cup would be held in the country. He established the Qatar Investment Authority. By 2013, it had invested over $100 billion around the world, most prominently in The Shard, Barclays Bank, Heathrow Airport, Harrods, Paris Saint-Germain F.C., Volkswagen, Siemens and Royal Dutch Shell.

Hamad ruled an autocratic regime in Qatar with no organized political opposition and prohibitions on free speech and dissent. During Hamad's rule, Qatar hosted two US military bases. It also maintained close relations with Iran. He supported and funded rebel movements, particularly in Libya and Syria during the Arab Spring, while maintaining political stability at home. The Sheikh founded news media group Al Jazeera. He also played a part in negotiations between the US and the Taliban. In June 2013, Hamad, in a brief televised address, announced that he would hand power to his fourth son, Tamim bin Hamad Al Thani.

Early years and education
Hamad was born in 1952. His mother died soon after his birth and he was raised by his uncle.

He graduated from the British Royal Military Academy at Sandhurst in 1971, and was then commissioned as a lieutenant colonel in Qatar's armed forces. A few months later he returned to Qatar and was made commander of a mobile brigade, which later became a force called "Hamad Brigade". In 1972, Hamad had the rank of general, and became army chief of staff. Next he was appointed commander-in-chief of Qatar's armed forces with the rank of major general. In 1977 he was named minister of defense.

Hamad was appointed Heir Apparent of Qatar in 1977 and held the post until 1995. In the early 1980s, he led the Supreme Planning Council, which sets Qatar's basic economic and social policies. From 1992, Hamad had a growing responsibility for the day-to-day running of the country, including the development of Qatar's oil and natural gas resources. On 27 June 1995, after deposing his father in a palace coup, Hamad became Emir of Qatar and was crowned on 20 June 2000.

In the early 1980s, Hamad led the Supreme Planning Council, which sets Qatar's basic economic and social policies. Starting in 1992, Hamad's father handed over responsibility for the day-to-day running of the country, including the development of Qatar's oil and natural gas resources, rendering him the effective ruler. However, his father ultimately retained control over state finances.

Reign as Emir (1995–2013) 

With the support of his family, Hamad took control of the country in 1995 while his father was on vacation abroad. While his father Khalifa bin Hamad Al Thani was in Geneva, Switzerland, Hamad bin Khalifa deposed him in a bloodless coup d'état. The deposition came after a falling out between Hamad bin Khalifa and his father, who had tried regaining some of the authority he bestowed upon Hamad in early 1995. Thereafter, his father lived in exile in France and Abu Dhabi until he returned to Qatar in 2004.

Hamad then engaged an American law firm to freeze his father's bank accounts abroad in order to deter a possible countercoup. However, a counter-coup was attempted against Hamad in February 1996 under the leadership of former Economy Minister Hamad bin Jassim bin Hamad Al Thani. The coup failed, and several of Qatar's traditional Arab allies were implicated in the plot, namely Saudi Arabia, the United Arab Emirates, Bahrain and Egypt.

In a break with the traditional role, his second wife Sheikha Moza bint Nasser Al-Missned has been a visible advocate for education and children's causes. In 1995, Sheikh Hamad and his wife Sheikha Moza bint Nasser founded the Qatar Foundation.

A sportsman and an accomplished diver, Hamad has played an active role in promoting and developing athletics in Qatar. His activism has enhanced the country's involvement and performance in a number of international competitions, including: winning an Olympic medal in track and field; hosting a wide variety of international sporting events such as the 15th Asian Games, GCC, Asian and World Youth soccer championships; and initiating the Qatar Open Tennis Championship which has grown to become one of two premier tennis competitions in the Middle East.

Under his rule the Qatari government helped to fund the Al Jazeera news network by an emiri decree. In an analysis of Al Jazeera, Hugh Miles said that diplomats from other countries know that the Emir is the real power behind Al Jazeera but he also quotes a network spokesman denying 'countless times' this accusation, adding that many independent news sources also have subsidies from their respective governments without this implying editorial dabbling and explaining that trying to coerce the kind of journalists Al Jazeera has would be like trying to 'herd cats'. Sheik Hamad is a distant cousin of the network chairman, Hamad bin Thamer Al Thani, who was previously Minister of Information in the Emir Al Thani government. Following the initial US$137 million grant from Emir Al Thani, Al Jazeera had aimed to become self-sufficient through advertising by 2001, but when this failed to occur, the Emir agreed to several consecutive loans on a year-by-year basis (US$30 million in 2004, according to Arnaud de Borchgrave). At a 3 October 2001 press conference, Colin Powell tried to persuade Sheik Hamad to shut down Al Jazeera while the New York-based organization Fairness and Accuracy in Reporting commented that in those efforts, "Powell and other U.S. officials were reportedly upset by the channel re-airing old interviews with bin Laden and the inclusion of guests that are too critical of the United States on its programs." The Washington Post reported in 2005 that Sheik Hamad was under pressure to privatize the network.

In 2010, the country won its controversial bid to host the 2022 FIFA World Cup in Doha.

Authoritarianism 
Hamad ruled an autocratic regime in Qatar. There was no organized political opposition in Qatar. Freedom of expression was limited under his rule and dissent was prohibited. National news outlets exercised self-censorship. In 2013, a Qatari poet was sentenced to 15 years in prison for criticizing Hamad.

Oil and gas wealth 

Hamad was able to focus on turning Qatar from a small desert backwater into a major world power by continuing to exploit the country’s vast oil fields and discovering and tapping the world’s third largest gas reserves. By 2010 liquefied natural gas production had reached 77 million tons, making Qatar the richest country in the world. With fewer than two million inhabitants, the average income in the country shot to a staggering $86,440 per year per person. Qatar expert Olivier Da Lage said: "When he came to power in 1995, Sheikh Hamad had a goal to place Qatar on the world map by exploiting the gas resources which his father did not develop for fear it would change the emirate's society.  Eighteen years on, he has finished the job – Qatar has acquired the financial clout to command respect from neighboring countries and Western governments alike".In 2005, under the direction of Hamad and the former prime minister of Qatar Sheikh Hamad bin Jassim bin Jaber Al Thani, the Qatar Investment Authority was established, a sovereign wealth fund to manage the country's oil and natural gas surpluses. The Qatar Investment Authority and its subsidiaries have acquired many businesses abroad, including London's iconic department store Harrods from entrepreneur Mohammed Al-Fayed, Paris-based department store Printemps, French football club Paris Saint-Germain F.C., a former 10% stake in Porsche, a 75% stake in film studio Miramax Films which they acquired from Disney, a 2% stake in media conglomerate and Universal Music Group parent company Vivendi, a $100 million USD investment in Chernin Group – whose founder Peter Chernin was COO of News Corp and President of Fox, a 1% stake in luxury goods manufacturer Louis Vuitton Moët Hennessy, a 6% stake in Credit Suisse, a 12.6% stake in Barclays and several other major companies. They also backed Glencore's $31 billion takeover bid for Xstrata.  Qatar is the largest property owner in London with their holdings including the United Kingdom's tallest building The Shard, the London Olympic Village and the InterContinental London Park Lane hotel. They also own several hotels in Cannes including the Majestic Hotel, Grand Hyatt Cannes Hôtel Martinez and the Carlton Hotel, Cannes. QIA was considered to have one of the leading bids in the sales of both Anschutz Entertainment Group and Hulu. As of May 2013, it was reported the Investment Authority was in talks to purchase Neiman Marcus and Bergdorf Goodman.

Media sources claimed that Sheikh Hamad bin Khalifa Al Thani made a bid for Manchester United on 11 February 2011. Qatari Holdings offered £1.65 billion to Malcolm Glazer, the American owner of the club. This follows a series of endeavors by the Emir and other Qataris into the World Football community, following Qatar's successful bid for the 2022 World Cup, and the Qatar Foundation's recent £125m shirt deal with FC Barcelona. In mid-June 2011, rumours resurfaced that Qatari Holdings were preparing a £2 Billion takeover bid and that the funding, that the club had been using for transfers since the start of June, was actually supplied by the Qataris and not the Glazer Family. In 2012 it was rumoured that Sheik Hamad bin Khalifa Al Thani was in bid for Rangers F.C. On 30 March 2012 Sheik Al Thani offered to buy KF Tirana, although the details have yet to be published.

Culture and education 
In the arts, Hamad established the Qatar Museums Authority in 2005 which built the I. M. Pei designed Museum of Islamic Art Doha. Since its opening, Qatar has become the world's biggest contemporary art buyer, famously purchasing Cézanne's The Card Players in 2012 for over US$250 million. The art acquisition efforts were often represented by Sheikh Saud bin Mohammed Al Thani, president of Qatar’s National Council for Culture, Arts and the Heritage.

The Museum Authority sponsored Takashi Murakami's EGO exhibit in Doha which ran from 9 February to 24 June 2012, Damien Hirst's retrospective at Tate Modern in Spring and Summer 2012 and Hirst's exhibition Relics, from October 2013 to January 2014. In July 2013, in conjunction with Miuccia Prada and the Prada Foundation, QMA launched CURATE, a global search for curatorial talent. Additionally, the Doha Film Institute was established in 2009 which in partnership with the Tribeca Film Festival (founded by Robert De Niro), created the Doha Tribeca Film Festival that ran from 2009 – 2012. The Doha Film Institute is producing Salma Hayek's upcoming animated adaptation of Khalil Gibran's classic novel The Prophet, with Lion King director Roger Allers coordinating the process. DFI is also credited as a production company on several other films, including Just Like a Woman starring Sienna Miller, The Reluctant Fundamentalist, directed by Mira Nair, which opened the 69th Venice International Film Festival, and Kanye West's Cruel Summer – a short film which was shot in Doha and premiered during the 2012 Cannes Film Festival. In February 2013, they announced a $100 million feature film fund with Participant Media, a production company founded by billionaire Jeffrey Skoll, who was the first employee and also first president of internet auction firm eBay.

Under the patronage of Hamad and his wife Sheikha Moza Bint Nasser Al-Missned, various academic institutions have opened campuses in Doha, including Carnegie Mellon University, Georgetown University, Northwestern University, Texas A&M University and Weill Cornell Medical College.

Abdication and later life

On 25 June 2013, Hamad handed over power to his son Tamim in a televised speech. In regards to the shift in power, Hamad said: "The time has come to open a new page in the journey of our nation that would have a new generation carry the responsibilities."

Since his abdication, he is now popularly referred to as the Father Emir. His fourth son Sheikh Tamim, from his second wife Sheikha Moza, is now the eighth and current Emir of Qatar.

Hamad is believed to have suffered from poor health for several years. In December 2015, he was flown to Zürich, Switzerland, for treatment after breaking his leg while on holiday in Morocco's Atlas mountains.

Foreign relations

The Emir made a $100 million donation for the relief of New Orleans following the 2005 Hurricane Katrina. He was a key person in the cease fire during the 2006 Lebanon War and contributed majorly in the relief of damaged areas. In 2012, the Emir proposed deploying Arab troops to reduce killings in the Syrian civil war. He provided two military bases for foreign troops, Al Udeid Air Base and Camp As Sayliyah.

Despite the prevalence of anti-Israel sentiment within the Arab world, he had previously maintained friendly relations with Israel. He met Foreign Minister of Israel Tzipi Livni (25 September 2007) in New York City. This marked the first real attempt by any leader in the Persian Gulf to pursue dialogue with Israel. However, Qatar severed diplomatic ties with Israel in 2009 in response to Israel's actions during the Gaza War. The emir has also expressed his objection to Israeli settlement policy, especially the Judaization of Jerusalem.

Gaza and Hamas
In October 2012, the Emir made a landmark visit to Gaza by being the first head of state to go there since the 2006 election of Hamas and the imposition of a blockade by Israel. He took a flight to Egypt before being driven into Gaza. While there, the emir was thought to be launching a $254 million reconstruction project in the territory, and giving an address to the Palestinian people. Palestine's interior ministry was said to have a "well-prepared plan" to provide security for the emir during his stay. Incidents nevertheless continued.

In October 2012, Hamad made a historic visit to Gaza and pledged US$400 million in humanitarian aid to Hamas, to build infrastructure projects and hospitals. Despite Qatar's ties to Hamas, they maintain diplomatic and business relations with Israel. Sheikh Hamad provided financial and material support to opposition rebels in both the Libyan Civil War, which led to the overthrow of Muammar Gaddafi, and the ongoing Syrian civil war which seeks to oust President Bashar al-Assad. It has been reported that he has also provided support to jihadist organizations such as Ansar Dine and the Movement for Unity and Jihad in West Africa, who are fighting for independence in the Northern Mali conflict, as well as the Al-Nusra Front in Syria.

Criticism and allegations of support to US designated terrorist organizations
In December 2012, The New York Times accused the Qatari government of funding the Al-Nusra Front, a U.S. government designated terrorist organization. Others have noted the Emir's visit to Gaza and meeting with Hamas, which houses a militant wing, Izz ad-Din al-Qassam Brigades. In January 2013, French politicians again accused the Emir's government of giving material support to Islamist groups in Mali and the French newspaper Le Canard enchaîné quoted an unnamed source in French military intelligence saying that "The MNLA, al Qaeda-linked Ansar Dine and MUJAO have all received cash from Doha."

Investments
In April 2016, Hamad was named in the Panama Papers.

Hamad is listed as owner of Afrodille S.A., which had a bank account in Luxembourg and shares in two South African companies. Al Thani also held a majority of the shares in Rienne S.A. and Yalis S.A., which held a term deposit with the Bank of China in Luxembourg. A relative owned 25% of these: Sheikh Hamad bin Jassim Al Thani, Qatar's former prime minister and foreign minister.

Marriages and children
Sheikh Hamad has three wives and twenty-four children, eleven sons and thirteen daughters:
Hamad's first wife is his first cousin, Sheikha Mariam bint Muhammad Al Thani, the daughter of his paternal uncle, Sheikh Muhammad bin Hamad bin Abdullah Al Thani. They have two sons and six daughters, namely:
Sheikh Mishaal bin Hamad bin Khalifa Al Thani (born 1972) – heir apparent of Qatar (1995–96)
Sheikh Fahd bin Hamad bin Khalifa Al Thani
Sheikha Aisha bint Hamad bin Khalifa Al Thani
Sheikha Fatima bint Hamad bin Khalifa Al Thani
Sheikha Rawdah bint Hamad bin Khalifa Al Thani
Sheikha Hessa bint Hamad bin Khalifa Al Thani
Sheikha Mashael bint Hamad bin Khalifa Al Thani
Sheikha Sara bint Hamad bin Khalifa Al Thani – Program Coordinator for Reach Out to Asia-Qatar (ROTAQ)
Hamad's second wife is Sheikha Moza bint Nasser Al-Missned (born 8 August 1959, Al-Khor), the daughter of Nasser bin Abdullah Al-Missned. They have five sons and two daughters, namely:
Sheikh Jassim bin Hamad bin Khalifa Al Thani (born 25 August 1978) – heir apparent of Qatar (1996–2003)
Sheikh Tamim bin Hamad bin Khalifa Al Thani (born 3 June 1980) – heir apparent of Qatar (2003–2013), current Emir of Qatar (2013–present)
Sheikha Al-Mayassa bint Hamad bin Khalifa Al Thani (born 1983)
Sheikha Hind bint Hamad bin Khalifa Al Thani (born 15 August 1984) 
Sheikh Joaan bin Hamad bin Khalifa Al Thani (born 1986)
Sheikh Mohammed bin Hamad bin Khalifa Al Thani (born 18 April 1988)
Sheikh Khalifa bin Hamad bin Khalifa Al Thani  (born 11 November 1991)
Hamad's third wife is Sheikha Noora bint Khalid Al Thani, again his first cousin, the daughter of his paternal uncle, Sheikh Khalid bin Hamad Al Thani, who was the minister of the interior. They have four sons and five daughters:
Sheikh Khalid bin Hamad bin Khalifa Al Thani
Sheikh Abdullah bin Hamad bin Khalifa Al Thani – Deputy Emir of Qatar since 11 November 2014.
Sheikh Thani bin Hamad bin Khalifa Al Thani(born on January 16,1994).
Sheikh Al Qaqa bin Hamad bin Khalifa Al Thani (born 30 June 2000)
Sheikha Lulwah bint Hamad bin Khalifa Al Thani
Sheikha Maha bint Hamad bin Khalifa Al Thani 
Sheikha Dana bint Hamad bin Khalifa Al Thani
Sheikha Alanoud bint Hamad bin Khalifa Al Thani
Sheikha Mariam bint Hamad bin Khalifa Al Thani

Titles, styles, honours and awards

Titles
1 January 1952 – 22 February 1972: Sheikh Hamad bin Khalifa Al Thani
22 February 1972 – 1977: His Excellency Sheikh Hamad bin Khalifa Al Thani
1977 – 27 June 1995: His Highness Sheikh Hamad bin Khalifa Al Thani, Crown Prince of Qatar
27 June 1995 – 25 June 2013: His Highness Sheikh Hamad bin Khalifa Al Thani, Emir of the State of Qatar
25 June 2013 – present: His Highness Sheikh Hamad bin Khalifa Al Thani, Father Emir of Qatar

Honours

National honours
 :
 Former Sovereign Knight Grand Cross with Collar of the Order of Independence
 Former Sovereign Knight Grand Cross with Collar of the Order of Merit

Foreign honours
 :
 Grand Cross of the Order of George Castriot Skanderbeg
 Recipient of the National Flag Order
 :
 Grand Cross of the Order of Honour for Services to the Republic of Austria, Special Class
 :
 Knight Grand Cross of the Order of Isa bin Salman Al Khalifa
 :
 Grand Cross of the Order of the Balkan Mountains
 :
 Grand Cross of the Grand Order of King Tomislav
 :
 Member of the Order of José Martí
 :
 Grand Cross Special Class of the Order of Merit of Duarte, Sánchez and Mella
 :
 Grand Cross with Collar of the Order of the Nile
 :
 Grand Cross with Collar of the Order of the White Rose
 :
 Grand Cross of the Order of the Legion of Honour
 :
 Grand Cross Special Class of the Order of Merit of the Federal Republic of Germany
 :
 Grand Cross of the Order of the Redeemer
 :
 Star of Mahaputera 1st Class
 :
 Grand Cross with Collar of the Order of Merit of the Italian Republic
 :
 Grand Cross with Collar of the Order of the Ivory Coast
 :
 Knight Grand Cordon with Collar of the Order of al-Hussein bin Ali
 :
 Knight Grand Cross with Collar of the Order of Mubarak the Great
 :
 Extraordinary Grade of the Order of Merit
 Grand Cross of the Order of the Cedar
 :
 Honorary Recipient of the Order of the Crown of the Realm
 :
 Honorary Companion of Honour with Collar of the National Order of Merit
 :
 Collar of the Order of Muhammad
 :
 Knight Grand Cross of Order of the Netherlands Lion
  North Macedonia:
 Grand Officer of the Order 8-September, 1st Class
 :
 Member Special Class of the Order of Oman
 Knight Grand Cross of the Order of Merit
 :
 Recipient of the Nishan-e-Pakistan
 : 
 Grand Cross of the Order of the Sun of Peru (13 February 2013)
 :
 Grand Collar (Supremo) of the Order of Lakandula
 :
 Grand Collar of the Order of Infante Henry
 :
 Grand Cross with Collar of the Order of the Star of Romania
 :
 Grand Cross with Collar of the Order of Abdulaziz al Saud
 :
 Grand Cross of the National Order of the Lion
 :
 Grand Cross with Collar of the Order of Good Hope
 :
 Knight Grand Cross with Collar of the Order of Isabella the Catholic
 :
 Knight of the Order of the Rajamitrabhorn
 :
 Grand Cross of the Order of 7 November
 :
 Honorary Knight Grand Cross of the Order of the Bath
 Honorary Knight Grand Cross of the Order of St Michael and St George
 :
 Grand Cross with Collar of the Order of the Liberator
 Grand Cross of the Order of Francisco de Miranda
 :
 Grand Cross of the Order of the Republic

Awards
 
 : Honorary Citizen of the City of Tirana
 
 International Association of Athletics Federations: Member of the Golden Order of Merit
 
 Foreign Policy Magazine': Top 100 Global Thinker - "For filling the leadership vacuum in the Middle East."

See also

List of the richest royals

References

External links

Denver Post article on His Highness Sheikh Hamad Bin Khalifa Al Thani and his rise to power
Stargate Photo of Sheikh Hamad Bin Khalifa's yacht no. 1
Constellation Photo of Sheikh Hamad Bin Khalifa's yacht no. 2

1952 births
Living people
Hamad Bin Khalifa
Graduates of the Royal Military Academy Sandhurst
Emirs of Qatar
Government ministers of Qatar
Muslim monarchs
People from Doha
Leaders who took power by coup
Prime Ministers of Qatar
Qatari Muslims
Monarchs who abdicated
Recipients of the Order of Skanderbeg (1990–)
Recipients of the Decoration for Services to the Republic of Austria
Recipients of the Grand Star of the Decoration for Services to the Republic of Austria
Order of Merit of Duarte, Sánchez and Mella
Grand Croix of the Légion d'honneur
Grand Crosses Special Class of the Order of Merit of the Federal Republic of Germany
Recipients of the Order of Merit of the Italian Republic
Knights Grand Cross with Collar of the Order of Merit of the Italian Republic
Extraordinary Grades of the Order of Merit (Lebanon)
Recipients of the National Order of the Cedar
Grand Cordons of the National Order of the Cedar
Recipients of the National Order of Merit (Malta)
Honorary Companions of Honour with Collar of the National Order of Merit (Malta)
Recipients of the Order of Lakandula
Grand Collars of the Order of Lakandula
Grand Crosses of the Order of Lakandula
Recipients of the Order of Prince Henry
Grand Collars of the Order of Prince Henry
Grand Crosses of the Order of Prince Henry
First Class of the Order of the Star of Romania
Collars of the Order of Isabella the Catholic
Knights Grand Cross of the Order of Isabella the Catholic
Honorary Knights Grand Cross of the Order of St Michael and St George
Honorary Knights Grand Cross of the Order of the Bath
Qatari billionaires
People named in the Panama Papers
Recipients of the Order of Prince Yaroslav the Wise, 1st class
Defense ministers of Qatar